Camp Casey is a U.S. military base in Dongducheon (also sometimes spelled Tongduchŏn or TDC), South Korea, 40 miles (64 km) north of Seoul, South Korea. Camp Casey was named in 1952 after Major Hugh Boyd Casey, who was killed in a plane crash near the camp site during the Korean War. Camp Casey is one of several U.S. Army bases in South Korea near the Korean Demilitarized Zone (DMZ). Camp Casey, Camp Hovey, and neighboring Camp Castle and Camp Mobile hold the main armor, 7th Division of a bridging engineer company as well, and mechanized infantry elements of the 2nd Infantry Division (United States) in South Korea. Camp Castle has been largely abandoned, with only a warehouse remaining. Camp Mobile was severely damaged during a flood in July 2011, and has been abandoned except for an unmanned aerial vehicle (UAV) company. Camp Casey spans 3,500 acres (14 km2) and is occupied by 6,300 military personnel and 2,500 civilians. There are plans for the relocation of most of the 2nd Infantry Division to Camp Humphreys which are underway with the latest estimate for completion being 2022. The Field Artillery Battalion remains for now at Camp Casey, while Camp Hovey is to be closed.

Camp Casey was home to several of the main combat units of the Second Infantry Division. Among them were the Second Battalion of the 9th Infantry Regiment. the First Battalion of the 72nd Armored Regiment (Crusaders), and the 210th Field Artillery Brigade. The 70th Brigade Support Battalion is currently located on Camp Casey, providing support to the line battalions of the brigade as well as depot and medical support to everyone stationed in the Camp Casey area. Alternating Brigades of the 1st Cavalry Division (United States) are scheduled to be at Camp Casey on 9-month rotations until facilities are ready at Camp Humphreys in 2022.

Facilities
Chapels
Commissary
Law Enforcement Centers:
Provost Marshal's Office - 2nd Infantry Division Provost Marshal and 55th Military Police CO
Hospitals available: 
Dental Clinic 
Health Clinic 
MWR facilities 
Airline Ticket Office
Recreation Center 
Super Day-rooms 
Library 
Internet Cafe
Movie Theatre (with 3D capability) - also serves as Conference Center
Golf Course 
Bowling Centers (one at Casey; one at Hovey) 
Indoor (Hovey) and Outdoor (Casey) Swimming Pools 
Outdoor Tennis / Basketball
Softball / Baseball Field
Arts & Crafts Center 
2 recently remodeled Gymnasiums
The Officer and NCO/Enlisted clubs are no more. They are now the Gateway Club (Casey), Warriors Club (Casey), and Iron Triangle Club (Hovey), and they are open to all military personnel.
Auto Car Care Center
USO
AAFES facilities available:
Post Exchange
Small Post Exchange Annex
LGU PLUS - Mobile, Internet, CATV (both Casey and Hovey)
Starbucks Coffee
Burger King
Popeyes Chicken
Anthony's Pizza
Charley's Steakery
Baskin Robbins
Smoothie King
Panda Kitchen Chinese Fusion (Hovey)
Krispy Kreme Donuts (Hovey)
Robin Hood Sandwiches
Tailor Shop 
Shoppette 
Class VI Store 
Pizza Delivery 
Filling Station 
Barber / Beauty Salon
GNC 
Department of Defense Dependents Schools - a K-8 School which opened on August 30, 2010; scheduled for closure in June 2016
Child and Youth School Services (CYSS) - a daycare for children under 6 years old and over; scheduled for closure in 2016

See also 
 List of United States Army installations in South Korea

References

External links 

  www.facebook.com/usagrc, Camp Casey and Area I Facebook page
 www.army.mil/usagcasey, official website of USAG Area I, Camp Red Cloud & Camp Casey, Korea
 army.mil
 GlobalSecurity.org

Buildings and structures in Dongducheon
Casey, Camp
Casey